Whirligig is the first studio album by the alternative rock band The Caulfields. It was released on audio cassette and CD on February 7, 1995, on A&M Records.

Critical reception

People called the album an "exceptionally smart collection of pop-rock gems with a sound that recalls the glory days of Elvis Costello & the Attractions." Trouser Press wrote: "Singer/guitarist John Faye chronicles slacker life in a sleepy college town, addressing alienation and the perceived hypocrisy of the adult world in short, catchy modern pop songs that occasionally betray his grave concerns about important matters."

Track listing
All tracks composed by John Faye; except where noted.
"Devil's Diary" – 3:36 
"Awake on Wednesday" - 4:32 
"Rickshaw" – 2:45	 
"Alex Again" (John Faye, Mike Simpson) – 3:24	 
"The Day That Came and Went" – 4:12 
"Fragile" – 4:09	 
"All of My Young Life" – 4:38	 
"Where Are They Now?" – 2:45	 
"Hannah, I Locked You Out" – 3:12	 
"Breathe Under Water" – 3:17
"The Underwater World of Asia X" – 3:59
"Disease" – 2:38

Personnel
The Caulfields
John Faye - vocals, guitar
Mike Simpson - lead guitar, backing vocals
Sam Musumeci - bass guitar, backing vocals; acoustic guitar on "Fragile"
Scott Kohlmorgen - drums
with:
Bruce Kaphan - Mellotron on "Devil's Diary"; pedal steel guitar and organ on "Fragile"

References

1995 debut albums
The Caulfields albums
A&M Records albums